God of the Serengeti is the second studio album by American rapper Vinnie Paz. It was released on October 22, 2012.

Background 
This effort follows up 2010's Season of The Assassin. The album is said to include production and MC skills from DJ Premier, Kool G Rap, DJ Lethal, Blaq Poet, C-Lance, R.A. the Rugged Man, Immortal Technique, La Coka Nostra, Mobb Deep, Tragedy Khadafi etc. On June 21, Paz released the first official video off the album, for the single "Cheesesteaks"  The album landed #12 on DJ Premier's top 20 albums of 2012

Commercial performance
The album sold 4,300 units during its first week.

Track listing

Charts

References 

2012 albums
Babygrande Records albums
Enemy Soil Records albums
Vinnie Paz albums
Albums produced by DJ Lethal
Albums produced by DJ Premier
Albums produced by Havoc (musician)
Albums produced by Marco Polo